The Ribat of Monastir is a ribat, an Islamic defensive structure, located in Monastir, Tunisia. It is the oldest ribat built by the Arab conquerors during the Muslim conquest of the Maghreb. It is also the most prominent monument of the city of Monastir.

History and architecture

Founded in 796 by the Abbasid leader and the governor of Ifriqiya, Harthama ibn A'yan, several improvements and changes were introduced to the building throughout the medieval times, including the expansion carried out by Abu al-Qasim ibn Tammam in 966. Initially it was quadrilateral shaped and then renovated into a composition of four buildings with two inner courtyards. There's also a spiral stair of about a hundred steps leading to the watchtower where visual messages were exchanged at night with the towers of neighboring ribats. Many watchtowers were added between 11th and 13th, 17th and 19th centuries in order to accommodate the artillery. The towers are also climbable, allowing visitors to enjoy a view of the city and the beach.

In addition to the small rooms dedicated to the worshiping Mujahideen who were performing prayer and meditation during their military duty, the ribat has two mosques, the largest of which hosts a unique collection of worshiping materials and traditional medieval industrial materials today.

References

Buildings and structures completed in the 8th century
Forts in Tunisia
Ribats
Monastir Governorate

Aghlabid architecture